The Oxendon Tunnels are disused  railway tunnels in Northamptonshire, England.  The Northampton to Market Harborough line opened in 1859 and had tunnels at Oxendon and nearby at Kelmarsh.

The original tunnel was single-track, and when the line was doubled a second single-track tunnel was built. Due to the small bore, the tunnels were known as "the rat-holes" by train drivers.

The former "up" line tunnel at Oxendon is open as part of the Brampton Valley Way, a linear park which runs from Boughton level crossing on the outskirts of Northampton to Little Bowden near Market Harborough, on the former railway trackbed.

See also 

 Tunnels in the United Kingdom

External links
Northampton & Lamport Railway

Buildings and structures in Northamptonshire
Rail transport in Northamptonshire
Railway tunnels in England
Pedestrian tunnels in the United Kingdom
Tunnels in Northamptonshire
Tunnels completed in 1859
Footpaths in Northamptonshire